The 2010 United States motorcycle Grand Prix was the ninth round of the 2010 Grand Prix motorcycle racing season. It took place on the weekend of July 23–25, 2010 at Laguna Seca. Only the MotoGP class raced at Laguna Seca.

MotoGP classification

Championship standings after the race (MotoGP)
Below are the standings for the top five riders and constructors after round nine has concluded.

Riders' Championship standings

Constructors' Championship standings

 Note: Only the top five positions are included for both sets of standings.

References

United States motorcycle Grand Prix
United States
United States Motorcycle Grand Prix
United States Motorcycle Grand Prix